Sewua is a town in the Bosomtwe District in the Ashanti Region of Ghana. It is at an elevation of 230 meters above sea level and inhabited by 104,194 people. The Chief of Sewua is  Nana Kwaku Amankwah Sarkodie II.

Institution 

 Sewua Regional Hospital

References

Populated places in the Ashanti Region